The ndzendze (dzendze, dzenzé)  is a Comorian musical instrument, of the box-zither type, possibly derived from the Malagasy valiha. The musician Soubi (Athoumane Soubira) of Mwali is recognized as a master of the instrument.

References

Comorian musical instruments
Box zithers